The Complete John Peel Sessions may refer to:

 The Complete John Peel Sessions (The Jesus and Mary Chain album), 2000
 The Complete John Peel Sessions (Gary Numan album), 2007
The Fall: The Complete Peel Sessions 1978–2004

See also
 Peel Sessions (disambiguation)